Wonderbug is a segment of the first and second season of the American television series The Krofft Supershow, from 1976 to 1978. It was shot in Hollywood, Los Angeles, California. The show was rerun as part of ABC's Sunday morning series.

Plot
Wonderbug's alter ego "Schlepcar" (so named due to its personalized California license plate "SCHLEP") was an old, beat up, conglomeration of several junked cars that looked like a rusty dune buggy. Like Herbie of The Walt Disney Company film fame, Schlepcar was alive and could drive itself, and could also talk in a mumbling voice. It was found in a junk yard by teenagers Barry Buntrock (David Levy), C.C. McNamara (John Anthony Bailey) and Susan Talbot (Carol Anne Seflinger). Schlepcar transformed into the shiny metal-flake orange Wonderbug (vocal effects provided by Frank Welker) whenever a magic horn (which played the bugle call for "cavalry charge") was sounded. In his Wonderbug identity, Schlepcar had the power of flight and was able to help the three teens capture crooks and prevent wrongdoing.

In Wonderbug mode, the car was a Volkswagen-based Meyers Manx-clone body. Specifically the body was a Dune Runner manufactured by Dune Buggy Enterprises of Westminster, California. Dune Buggy Enterprises offered the Dune Runner with three different hood choices. Wonderbug has the T- Bird hood choice.

The car had articulated eyeball headlights, and a custom bumper that resembled a mouth; different bumpers were sometimes used to give the car different facial expressions. When the car spoke in its mumbling voice, a rubber puppet stand-in with a moving mouth was sometimes used.

The space that would normally contain the right rear passenger seat instead contained a box, described in dialog as "the costume/wardrobe trunk"; this box actually served to conceal a hidden driver in scenes in which the car drives itself. The car also had a long fender-mounted radio antenna that terminated with a robot-like claw or gripper. Its license plate would change to "1DERBUG".

Barry often thought he was the brains of the outfit, but it was usually Susan who came up with the ideas that saved them. A running gag was that Barry would suggest an outrageously implausible plan, its absurdity recognized by both C.C. and Susan. Susan would then suggest a far more sensible plan (usually involving disguises), which Barry would then suggest as if it were his own, prompting C.C. to praise Barry's supposed genius. Susan accepted the situation uncomplainingly, even telling a female character who observed one such exchange, "You get used to it".

Other appearances
Wonderbug shared the one-hour time slot with other Krofft Supershow titles, including Magic Mongo, Bigfoot and Wildboy, Dr. Shrinker, The Lost Saucer, and Electra Woman and Dyna Girl.

Ideal Toy Company published a board game in 1977.

Aladdin Industries produced a metal lunchbox in 1976.

Episodes

Season 1 (1976)

Season 2 (1977)

References

External links
 Official Sid & Marty Krofft MySpace Page
 
 
 The World of Sid & Marty Krofft Fact Sheet Version 2.2
 70's Live Kid Videos - Wonderbug
 Program Lead-in, SF Signal

American children's action television series
American children's adventure television series
American children's fantasy television series
American Broadcasting Company original programming
1970s American children's television series
1976 American television series debuts
1978 American television series endings
Fictional cars
Television series by Sid and Marty Krofft Television Productions
The Krofft Supershow
American television shows featuring puppetry
Television series created by Joe Ruby
Television shows filmed in Los Angeles
Television series created by Ken Spears
Television series about teenagers